Under the Black Umbrella: Voices From Colonial Korea, 1910-1945 is a book by writer Hildi Kang published by Cornell University Press in 2001. It shows a general snapshot of feelings towards the Japanese many years after the colonization of Korea.

References

Books about Korea
Korea under Japanese rule
2001 non-fiction books
Cornell University Press books